Yawri Bay is a bay in the coast of Sierra Leone on the Atlantic Ocean.

Geography
Yawri Bay opens to the southwest and is located about 25 km to the south of Freetown. The Banana Islands —including Dublin Island, Ricketts Island and Wolf Rock— as well as Thistle Island close to the headland, are located off the northwestern point enclosing the bay.

References

Bays of the Atlantic Ocean
Bodies of water of Sierra Leone
Bays of Africa